Tony Jones may refer to:

Sports
 Tony Jones (wide receiver) (born 1965), former NFL wide receiver
 Tony Jones (offensive tackle) (1966–2021), NFL offensive lineman
 Tony Jones Jr. (born 1997), American football running back
 Tony Jones (footballer) (1937–1990), English footballer
 Tony Jones (wrestler) (born 1971), professional wrestler
 Tony Jones (basketball), American professional basketball coach

Journalism
 Tony Jones (news journalist) (born 1955), Australian current affairs journalist on Lateline
 Tony Jones (sports journalist) (born 1961), Australian sports reporter with the Nine Network
 Tony Jones (football reporter) (born 1958), British sports commentator

Other
 Tony Jones (backpacker) (born 1962), West Australian who disappeared in Queensland
 Tony Jones (theologian) (born 1968), American theologian involved in the emerging church movement
 Tony Jones (snooker player) (born 1960), English snooker player
 Tony Jones (born 1963), English bass guitarist with The Christians
 Tony Jones (Magi-Nation), fictional main character of Magi Nation game and TV show
 Tony Jones (General Hospital), fictional character on American soap opera General Hospital
 Toby Jones, a character in various spoof commercials played by comedian Robert L. Hines

See also
 Antony Armstrong-Jones, 1st Earl of Snowdon (1930–2017), who married Princess Margaret
 Anthony Jones (disambiguation)
 Tony Ray-Jones (1941–1972), British photographer